The Independent Democratic Union of Chad (UDIT) was a political party in Chad.

History
The party won 16 seats in the 1959 parliamentary elections, emerging as the main opposition to the Chadian Progressive Party–African Democratic Rally alliance.

References

Defunct political parties in Chad
1950s in Chad